The Clermont colonial by-election, September 1866 was a by-election held on 11 September 1866 in the electoral district of Clermont for the Queensland Legislative Assembly.

History
On 18 August 1866, Sydney Davis, the member for Clermont, resigned. Roderick Travers won the resulting by-election on 11 September 1866.

However, Travers declined to take the seat and resigned on 12 October 1866. A further by-election on 13 November 1866 was won by George Forbes.

See also
 Members of the Queensland Legislative Assembly, 1863–1867

References

1866 elections in Australia
Queensland state by-elections
1860s in Queensland